Recurvaria sartor is a moth of the family Gelechiidae. It is found in Mexico (Guerrero).

The forewings are fawn-brownish, with a lilac tinge, the costa is slightly shaded along the basal half. There is a patch of black raised scales on the dorsum at one-fourth, partially connected by blackish scaling along the dorsum, with a second smaller but otherwise similar spot at about two-thirds. The hindwings are pale shining silvery grey.

References

Moths described in 1910
Recurvaria
Moths of Central America